The schooner María Chica was one of the first armed Dominican naval vessels of the Dominican War of Independence and is claimed to be one of the founding vessels of the Dominican Navy. She was captained by Commander Juan Bautista Maggiolo during the Dominican War of Independence. Before the war, the schooner was owned by Catalan merchants José and Francisco Ginebra.

See also
 Battle of Tortuguero
 Dominican Navy

Schooners of the Dominican Navy
1844 ships